Caplan station was a Via Rail station in Caplan, Quebec, Canada. It is a flag stop with no ticket agent (tickets were sold on the train).

, the Gaspé train is not running; the closest passenger rail service is provided at the Matapédia railway station. It is unknown if or when service to Gaspé will resume.

References

External links

Via Rail stations in Quebec
Railway stations in Gaspésie–Îles-de-la-Madeleine
Disused railway stations in Canada